William Henry Reynolds (June 14, 1910 – July 16, 1997) was an American film editor whose career spanned six decades. His credits include notable films such as The Sound of Music, The Godfather, The Sting, and The Turning Point. He also was associated with two box-office bombs, Ishtar and Heaven's Gate, which he was the executive producer.

Biography
Born in Elmira, New York, Reynolds began his career in 1934 as a member of the swing gang at 20th Century Fox. He became a protégé of film editor Robert Simpson, who brought him to Paramount Pictures as his assistant in 1936. The following year, he edited his first project, the musical film 52nd Street. In 1942, he joined 20th Century Fox, where he remained for 28 years. It was there that he frequently collaborated with two notable directors. His wartime service put a temporary halt to his career. However, he did manage to sustain continuity by editing U.S. Army training films from 1942 to 1946. For Robert Wise, he edited The Day the Earth Stood Still, The Sound of Music, The Sand Pebbles, Star!, and Two People. His work for Joshua Logan included Bus Stop, South Pacific, Fanny, and Ensign Pulver. 

Additional credits include Algiers; Come to the Stable; Beneath the 12-Mile Reef; Three Coins in the Fountain; Good Morning, Miss Dove; Love Is a Many-Splendored Thing; Carousel;  Compulsion; Wild River; Taras Bulba; Hello, Dolly!; The Great White Hope; The Great Waldo Pepper; Nijinsky; Author! Author!; The Little Drummer Girl; Newsies; and the television adaptation of Gypsy.   

Reynolds died of cancer in South Pasadena, California at the age of 87.

Awards and listings
Reynolds was nominated for the Academy Award for Best Film Editing seven times and won for The Sound of Music and The Sting. He received the American Cinema Editors Career Achievement Award in 1991.

In 2012, the Motion Picture Editors Guild published a list of the best-edited films of all time. Two films edited by Reynolds appeared on the list. The Godfather was ranked sixth and The Sound of Music was sixty-fourth.

See also
List of film director and editor collaborations

References

External links
 

Best Film Editing Academy Award winners
People from Elmira, New York
1910 births
1997 deaths
20th Century Studios people
American film editors